The Jenin refugee camp, also known as the Jenin camp, is a Palestinian refugee camp located in the city of Jenin in the northern West Bank. It was established in 1953 to house Palestinians who abandoned their homes during and in the aftermath of the 1948 Palestine War. The camp has since become a hotbed of Palestinian terrorism, and has become known as "the martyr's capital" by Palestinians, and "the hornet's nest" by the Israel Defence Forces.

The camp was the location of several incidents relating to the Israeli–Palestinian conflict, most notably the 2002 Battle of Jenin between Israel and Palestinian militants and the 2022 killing of Al Jazeera journalist Shireen Abu Akleh, and remains the site of frequent clashes between Israeli forces and Palestinians.

The camp has a high population density, estimated at 33,000/km2 by the UNRWA. Refugees in the camp face difficult living conditions, which are caused in part by Israeli restrictions. The camp has a high unemployment rate compared to the rest of the West Bank, and many refugees live in substandard shelters, with poor sewage networks and common shortages in water and electricity.

History

Establishment 
The Jenin refugee camp was formally established in 1953, after a snowstorm had destroyed a previous refugee camp in the region. The camp was established over 372 dunams of land that was leased to the United Nations Relief and Works Agency for Palestine Refugees in the Near East (UNRWA) for an extended period of time, and was later expanded to 473 dunams (0.42 km2).

The camp is located in the city of Jenin. To its north is the Jezreel Valley or Marj Ibn Amir, and to its east is Jordan Valley. The camp, and the entirety of the West Bank, was under Jordanian control at the time of its establishment, following the Jordanian annexation of the West Bank that took place in 1950.

Israeli occupation and rise of militancy 

Following the defeat of the Arab Armies in the Six-Day War of 1967, the West Bank, including the Jenin camp, came under Israeli occupation.

Following the Israeli invasion of southern Lebanon in 1982, the Palestine Liberation Organization (PLO) was forced out of the country, settling in Tunisia. However, many PLO militants chose to return to the occupied Palestinian territories, leading to the emergence of a number of militant groups, a number of which were centered in the vicinity of Jenin. These groups included the 'Black Panthers' of Fatah and the 'Red Eagles' of the Popular Front for the Liberation of Palestine (PFLP).

First Intifada and Oslo years 

The residents of the Jenin camp participated in the First Intifada, a major Palestinian uprising against Israel that took place in the late 1980s and early 1990s. During that intifada, the camp was the target of several Israeli raids conducted in search of militants. The Oslo Accords, signed at the end of the First Intifada, transferred the control and administration of the camp to the then-newly established Palestinian National Authority (PA).

Second Intifada and Battle of Jenin 

The Jenin camp was heavily involved the Second Intifada, another major Palestinian uprising against Israel that took place in the early 2000s. In April 2002, after a string of Palestinian suicide attacks, Israeli forces entered the camp as part of Operation Defensive Shield, commencing the Battle of Jenin. Israel claimed that the camp was a hotbed of Palestinian militancy, and prevented relief workers and reporters from entering the camp, claiming that booby traps set up by the Palestinians were a serious concern. Palestinians later acknowledged that explosives were placed throughout the camp.

The battle lasted for ten days between 1 April and 11 April, and Israel began withdrawing its troops on 18 April. Over the course of the battle, over 400 homes were destroyed, and hundreds more were severely damaged. A UN envoy likened the camp to an earthquake zone, as did a reporter for the Associated Press who later visited the camp. The BBC reported that ten percent of the camp was "virtually rubbed out by a dozen armored Israeli bulldozers".

A report by the United Nations stated that 52 Palestinians and 23 Israeli soldiers were killed in the battle, although the Palestinians claim that the Israeli military killed 500 people during the battle. 4,000 people, a quarter of the camp's pre-battle population, were left homeless because of the destruction.

Reconstruction after the Battle of Jenin 
After the battle, the Israeli housing minister offered to rebuild the camp at a nearby location and with enlarged roads. However, the camp's residents rejected the proposal, which they saw as an attempt to erase the political symbolism of Palestinian refugee camps, whose existence they see as a living testament to the Nakba.

By 2005, the UNRWA had completed the reconstruction of the camp, in an operation that was described as "the largest humanitarian intervention during the Second Intifada". However, this rebuild has been criticized by the camp's residents, who said that the new network of roads exposed them to greater violence and insecurity as it made it easier for Israeli jeeps and tanks to enter the camp.

Subsequent violence 
The Jenin camp is located in Area A of the West Bank, which is under de jure civil and security control by the Palestinian National Authority. However, Israeli forces frequently carry out incursions into the camp with the declared objective of conducting counter-terrorism operations. However, Palestinians say that the Israeli forces target not only militants but also noncombatant civilians, with a paramedic telling the CNN that he didn't feel safe, "even in uniform". These near-daily Israeli raids mostly occur during the night, and lead to clashes with militants.

Gilboa prison break 

In September 2021, Ayham Kamamji and Monadel Nafe'at, the final two prisoners at large after the Gilboa Prison break, were rearrested in the Jenin camp, along with two residents who allegedly helped the escapees. The captures took place during a raid by Israeli forces.

Killing of Shireen Abu Akleh 

In May 2022, Al Jazeera journalist Shireen Abu Akleh was killed in the Jenin camp while trying to cover an Israeli raid. Al Jazeera has accused the Israeli forces of deliberately shooting her, although an IDF report has said that the shooting was accidental. The CNN have published evidence which suggests that Abu Akleh was "shot dead in a targeted attack by Israeli forces".

January 2023 incursion 

On 26 January 2023, the Israeli military raided the city of Jenin and its refugee camp. The IDF said that it was acting against a "terror squad belonging to the Islamic Jihad", which it said was "involved in executing and planning multiple major terror attacks, including shooting attacks on IDF soldiers and Israeli civilians". During the raid, IDF forces killed ten Palestinians, including three civilians, one of whom was a 61 year-old woman.

The Israeli raid was described as the "deadliest in two decades", and was followed by a Palestinian shooting at a synagogue in Jerusalem, which killed seven Israelis. In reaction to the Israeli raid, the PA announced it would sever security coordination with Israel.

Palestinian militancy 

The Jenin camp has become a center of Palestinian militancy. The al-Quds Brigades of the Palestinian Islamic Jihad (PIJ) and the al-Aqsa Martyrs' Brigades of Fatah are the two most prominent armed groups in the camp, while the Izz ad-Din al-Qassam Brigades of Hamas have recently begun to maintain a more viable presence.

Armed militants enjoy high levels of support amongst the residents of the camp, who condemn the Palestinian Authority as "collaborators with the occupation". The camp is sometimes referred to by Palestinians as "the martyrs' capital", and by the Israeli military as "the hornets' nest". In January 2023, thirty five Palestinians were killed in the West Bank in the context of the Israeli-Palestinian conflict, twenty of whom were from the Jenin camp.

In contrast, the Palestinian Authority's control over the camp has been relatively weak, due to its location far away from Ramallah, the de facto capital of the PA. In fact, PA forces seldom enter the camp. Israel has blamed the PA for its "incompetence", which has led to the "deterioration of security conditions". However, the PA has rejected these claims, criticizing Israel for "deliberately acting to weaken it", and saying that Israeli actions are to blame for Palestinian violence.

Jenin Brigades 

The Jenin Battalion, also known as the Jenin Brigades, is a Palestinian armed group that has recently appeared in the Jenin camp. Initially founded by the PIJ in 2021 to serve as a local branch for the al-Quds Brigades, it has developed into an affiliation of armed militants from several factions, similar to the Lion's Den group in Nablus. According to Al-Monitor, the two groups maintain high coordination with each other.

According to Moein Odeh, an expert on Palestinian affairs, the Jenin Brigades consist of teenagers and men in their early twenties, and do not have a clear hierarchical structure of command, making it difficult to track down members. Observers say that the Jenin Brigades, and other similar groups, formed amidst "a complete loss of confidence in the Palestinian political leadership".

Demographics

Population 
The Palestinian Central Bureau of Statistics (PCBS) estimates that the population of the Jenin camp will reach 11,674 people by June 2023, while Al Jazeera reports that the camp has a population of more than 22,000 refugees. However, many other sources report a figure between 13,000 and 15,000 refugees, which gives a population density closer to the UNRWA estimate of 33,000/km2.

These differences in population counts stem from the fact that many refugees left the camp in the aftermath of the Second Intifada but are still registered refugees, and the fact that a number of registered households live outside formal camp boundaries.

Origins 
The Jenin camp houses Palestinian refugees who were displaced form their homes in the regions of Haifa and the Carmel mountains, areas relatively close to the camp's location, allowing the camp's refugees to maintain close ties to their relatives across the Green Line.

Camp conditions

Housing 
During the first years of the Jenin camp, refugees lived at former barracks that were evacuated by the British Army, then at an abandoned train station from the Ottoman period, then at tents provided by the UNRWA. It wasn't until a few years later that the camp's residents began building mud houses to replace their tents, while concrete houses did not appear until the 1970s.

Even today, the camp's residents face problems due to poor sewage networks, and many live in shelters that lack appropriate lighting and ventilation. Moreover, water and electricity shortages have become increasingly common in recent years, particularly in the summer.

Unemployment 
The Jenin camp has an unemployment rate of 22%, compared to the West Bank average of 16%. Many residents previously relied upon work in Israel, but that has become more difficult since the construction of the West Bank Wall and the implementation of the permit regime, which mandates Palestinians to obtain a number of separate permits, issued by the Israeli administration in the West Bank, for a wide range of activities.

Agriculture 
Due to its proximity to the Jezreel Valley, the camp has one of the largest fertile plains in Palestine, and is sometimes called the "breadbasket of the West Bank". However, Israeli restrictions have blocked agricultural sales inside Israel, which has lead to the devaluation of crops.

Public services 
In the camp, there is one health center, administered by the UNRWA, and there are five schools, built with local support from a charitable organization in Nablus. However, difficult economic conditions have raised the pressure on young boys to leave school for work, and on young girls to leave school for marriage. A survey by the IWS found that 14% of married females between 15–65 years of age have married under the age of fifteen, and 28% under the age of sixteen.

Notable people 
The following people are from the Jenin refugee camp:

  – Politician and former member of Parliament.
 Mahmoud Tawalbe – Commander of the al-Quds Brigades (PIJ); killed in the 2002 battle.
 Zakaria Zubeidi – Former commander of the al-Aqsa Martyrs' Brigades (Fatah); currently imprisoned by Israel and one of the Gilboa prison escapees.

Gallery

See also 

 Palestinian refugees
 Palestinian refugee camps

References 

Jenin Governorate
Palestinian refugee camps in the West Bank
Populated places established in 1953